PT Djarum (literally "needle") is an Indonesian kretek (clove cigarette) brand/manufacturer founded on 21 April 1951 by Oei Wie Gwan in Kudus, Central Java. It produces dozens of domestic and international brands. Djarum Black, Super and L.A. Lights are among the most popular products of Djarum. The company owns the PB Djarum, a professional badminton club, the Italian football club Como 1907, and is the main sponsor of the Liga 1, Indonesia's top football league from 2005 to 2011. Under its direct parent PT Dwimuria Investama Andalan (also known as Djarum Group), it has non-cigarette business lines in technology, banking and beverages.

History
In 1951, Oei Wie Gwan, an ethnic Chinese businessman, bought a nearly defunct cigarette company in Kudus, Central Java known as NV Murup. The brand was called Djarum Gramofon which means 'gramophone needle'; he shortened it to Djarum (current spelling: jarum) which means needle. The company's first brand was 'Djarum'. The company nearly collapsed in 1963 when its factory was destroyed in a fire, followed by the death of Oei Wie Gwan. The new owners, Oei Wie Gwan's children Budi and Bambang Hartono, took the opportunity to rebuild the company.

The company began producing machine-rolled kretek in early 1970 but also continues to produce hand-rolled kretek made by manual laborers.
 
Djarum Super was launched in 1981, followed by introduction of Djarum Special in 1983.

While the domestic market for kretek was large, in 1972 the company began exporting hand-rolled kretek to tobacco retailers around the world. Budi and Bambang Hartono diversified the company's activities outside cigarette manufacturing.

After the 1997 Asian financial crisis, the company became a part of a consortium which bought Bank Central Asia (BCA) from BPPN. BCA is the largest private bank in Indonesia and was formerly a part of the Salim Group. Presently the majority stake of the bank (51%) is controlled by Djarum. In 2004, the Djarum Group acquired a 30-year BOT contract from the government to develop and renovate Hotel Indonesia in Jakarta under the Grand Indonesia superblock project.

The Djarum badminton club (PB Djarum) was founded in 1974 by Budi Hartono. Its players, such as Liem Swie King and Alan Budikusuma, have won numerous championships for Indonesia.

Since the Family Smoking Prevention and Tobacco Control Act in 2009 banned most flavored cigarettes in the United States, Djarum's clove products are now marketed as "filtered cigars" and are wrapped in tobacco leaf instead of black paper. The tobacco is air-cured, and they are packaged in boxes of 12 instead of 20.

Non-cigarette business lines

Websites and events
Some of them are sponsored by Djarum brands.
Super Soccer (soccer internet streaming (2016–2019) and news platforms)

Involvement in sports
PB Djarum (badminton club funded by Djarum Foundation)
Sponsorship of Indonesian top league:
2005–2007 as Liga Djarum Indonesia
2008–2011 as Djarum Indonesia Super League
 Como 1907 (football club)

References

External links

Tobacco companies of Indonesia
Privately held companies of Indonesia
Tobacciana
Indonesian brands
Hartono family
1951 establishments in Indonesia
Manufacturing companies established in 1951